Rafdi Rashid (born 21 January 1977) is a former Malaysian footballer.

The Kedah-born striker has been playing for several team in his career such Kedah, Perlis and Perak.
He played for national Olympic 2000 team and had short stint with main national senior team.

He was considered a hero for Kedah and Perak fans, after getting their team to final match of Malaysia Cup and eventually becomes a hot prospect. After getting serious injury when playing with Perak, he has mutually terminate he contract and signed with Sarawak FA.

His younger sister Nurrashidah Rashid is currently a Malaysian national sepaktakraw player. His younger brother Akhyar is also a professional footballer.

References

Malaysian footballers
Kedah Darul Aman F.C. players
1977 births
Living people
Perlis FA players
Perak F.C. players
Sarawak FA players
People from Kedah
Association football forwards
Association football midfielders